Ahrendsberg is an uninhabited island,  in area, near the island of Poel in the Breitling, a strait off the Bay of Wismar on the Baltic coast of Germany.

The higher areas are generally very dry and are characterised by stunted vegetation, for example dry, lean grassland with thorn bushes. At the southern tip of the island is a short section of cliff.

External links 
 www.naturschutz-wismarbucht.de

Islands of Mecklenburg-Western Pomerania
German islands in the Baltic
Bay of Wismar
Uninhabited islands of Germany